The 1989 German Formula Three Championship was a multi-event motor racing championship for single-seat open wheel formula racing cars that held across Europe. The championship featured drivers competing in two-litre Formula Three racing cars which conform to the technical regulations, or formula, for the championship. It commenced on 16 April at Hockenheim and ended at the same place on 30 September after twelve rounds.

Krafft Walzen Team Marko RSM driver Karl Wendlinger became a champion. He won one of the tightest championship battle in the history of the German Formula Three, as top-three drivers in the drivers were divided just by one point. Heinz-Harald Frentzen finished as runner-up and had one more race victory than other drivers in top-three. Michael Schumacher was equal on points with Frentzen and victorious at Zeltweg and Nürburgring. Michael Bartels, Peter Zakowski and Frank Krämer were the other race winners. Franz Engstler clinched the B-Cup championship title.

Teams and drivers
{|
|

Calendar

Results

Championship standings

A-Class
Points are awarded as follows:

References

External links
 

German Formula Three Championship seasons
Formula Three season